Spanish Blues Band is an album by jazz percussionist Willie Bobo recorded in 1968 and released on the Verve label.

Reception

Allmusic awarded the album three stars out of five.

Track listing
 "Tweedlee Dee" (Winfield Scott) -	2:22
 "I Heard It Through the Grapevine" (Norman Whitfield, Barrett Strong) - 3:05
 "I Wish It Would Rain" (Whitfield, Strong, Roger Penzabene) - 4:42
 "Bad, Bad Whiskey" (Amos Milburn) - 2:30
 "I Want To Walk You Home" (Fats Domino) - 2:29
 "Walk Away Renée" (Michael Brown, Bob Calilli, Tony Sansone) - 3:02
 "Move On Over" (Bert Keyes, Willie Bob) - 2:59
 "Stuff" (Clarence "Sonny" Henry) - 2:41
 "(Sittin' On) The Dock of the Bay" (Otis Redding, Steve Cropper) - 2:42
 "Many Tears Ago" (Scott) - 3:10
 "Soul Cookin'" (Dave Clowney) - 2:21  
Recorded in New York City on February 9 (tracks 4 & 8), February 12 (tracks 1, 2 & 5), February 16 (track 11),  February 19 (track 9), March 4 (tracks 3, 6 & 10) and March 12 (track 7), 1968

Personnel
Willie Bobo - timbales, percussion
Unidentified musicians
Bert DeCoteaux (tracks: 3, 6 & 10), Bert Keyes (tracks: 1, 2, 4, 5, 7, 9 & 11), Sonny Henry (track 8) - arranger

References

Verve Records albums
Willie Bobo albums
Albums produced by Teddy Reig
1968 albums